Arthur M. Rogers (April 1, 1860 – August 11, 1939) was a member of the Wisconsin State Assembly.

Biography
Rogers was born on April 1, 1860 in Fisk, Wisconsin, the son of Chester Rogers and Evelyn Ripley Rogers. He moved to Shawano County, Wisconsin in 1879 and Rhinelander, Wisconsin in 1885 before settling in Forest County, Wisconsin. He married Ettie Holford in 1882. He died on August 11, 1939 and was buried at Forest Home Cemetery in Rhinelander.

Career
Rogers was elected to the Assembly in 1916. Other positions he held include County Surveyor of Forest County. He was a Republican.

References

People from Winnebago County, Wisconsin
People from Shawano County, Wisconsin
People from Rhinelander, Wisconsin
People from Forest County, Wisconsin
Republican Party members of the Wisconsin State Assembly
American surveyors
1860 births
1939 deaths